Jung Byung-gil (born August 7, 1980) is a South Korean film director and screenwriter. Jung was trained at the Seoul Action School. He graduated from Chung-Ang University, majoring in film, before making his directorial debut with a documentary about stuntmen, Action Boys, in 2008. Jung gained international recognition
with the action thriller The Villainess, which premiered at the Cannes Film Festival in 2017. He is set to make his Hollywood debut with Afterburn, an adaptation of the comic of the same name, starring Gerard Butler.

Filmography 
Three Important Components for Rock'n Roll (2006, documentary short) - director, screenwriter, executive producer, cinematographer, producer
Action Boys (2008) - director, screenwriter, cinematographer, editor, actor 
Bandhobi (2009) - actor (passerby)
Confession of Murder (2012) - director, screenwriter
The Villainess (2017) - director, screenwriter, executive producer 
Carter (2022) - director, screenwriter
Afterburn (upcoming) - director

Awards and nominations

References

External links 
 
 

1980 births
Living people
South Korean film directors
South Korean screenwriters
Chung-Ang University alumni